The Bethanie Desalination Plant, also Bethany Desalination Plant, is a brackish water desalination plant in the settlement of Bethanie, in Namibia. The facility is owned and was developed by the Namibia Water Corporation (NamWater).

Location
The desalination plant is located in the town of Bethanie, in the ǁKaras Region of Namibia.

Overview
The objective of this project is to improve the quantity and quality of drinking water available to the inhabitants of Bethany. It was developed as a pilot project to explore the feasibility of desalinating brackish ground water for domestic and light commercial use. This is part of the Namibian government's attempt to increase water supply to Namibians, from 85 percent in 2022 to 100 percent. Namibia has set a goal to have 100 percent potable water supply to her citizens and residents by 2030.

The plant is designed to process raw brackish ground water through desalination equipment that includes reverse osmosis membranes. Due to the rural location, renewable energy sources were selected. The installation is fitted with solar panels, so that the sun provides the power to fuel the desalination process.

Development
A number of national and international stakeholders worked together to design, construct and fund this desalination plant. The table below details the entities that supported this development.

1. The Multilateral Environmental Agreements Division of the Namibian Ministry of Environment, Forestry and Tourism is a stakeholder in the development of this plant.

Funding and timeline
The construction is reported to have cost N$37 million (approx. US$2.3 million), funded by the stakeholders listed in the previous section. Construction took place between "October 2020 and October 2021", with commercial commissioning in July 2022.

See also
 Desalination
 Water supply and sanitation in Namibia

Notes

References

External links
 Pilot rural desalination plants using renewable power and membrane technology  

Buildings and structures in ǁKaras Region
2022 establishments in Namibia
Infrastructure completed in 2022
Water resources management